JTY may refer to:
 Astypalaia Island National Airport, in Greece
 Jatayu Airlines, an Indonesian airline